Leslie S. Libow (born December 26, 1933) is Clinical Professor of Medicine and of Geriatrics at the Icahn School of Medicine at Mount Sinai. He previously was Greenwall Professor of Geriatrics and Adult Development at Icahn School of Medicine at Mount Sinai from 1982 to 2011 and Chief of Medical Services at the Jewish Home and Hospital from 1982 to 2004. Libow is an authority on internal and geriatric medicine and is also known for creating the field of Geriatric Medicine in America.

References

1933 births
Living people
American geriatricians
Brooklyn College alumni
People from Brooklyn
Icahn School of Medicine at Mount Sinai faculty